Doris Hill (March 21, 1905 – March 3, 1976), born Roberta M. Hill, was an American film actress of the 1920s and 1930s.

Early years
Born and raised in Roswell, New Mexico, Hill was the daughter of rancher William A. Hill. She was educated in Fort Worth, Texas.

When she was a child, Hill began dancing in public. A Warner Brothers casting director saw her dancing at the Metropolitan Theater in Los Angeles, which led to her making a screen test.

Career

Hill moved to Hollywood in the mid-1920s to pursue an acting career. First working as a vaudeville dancer, she received her first film acting role in 1926 when she starred alongside George O'Hara in Is That Nice? (or in The Better 'Ole). She starred in 17 films from 1926 to 1929, and unlike many silent film stars, she made a successful transition to talking films.

In 1929, Hill was selected as one of 13 actresses to be WAMPAS Baby Stars. On contract with Paramount Pictures, she starred in four films in 1930, including Sons of the Saddle with popular western actor Ken Maynard. Western film roles became her most common parts, with her often starring opposite Tom Tyler. In 1932, she starred in another six films, four of which were westerns. In 1933, she starred in four films, all westerns, and by 1934, her career had slowed to almost no roles.

Her last acting role was in the 1934 western Ridin' Gents opposite Jack Perrin and Ben Corbett.

Personal life
Hill retired and married actor George L. Derrick in June 1932, but they divorced shortly after. She then married Hollywood director, producer and writer Monte Brice, and eventually moved to Kingman, Arizona.

Death
Hill died in Kingman, Arizona, on March 3, 1976, aged 70.

Partial filmography
 Tom and His Pals (1926)
 The Better 'Ole (1926)
 Rough House Rosie (1927)
 Tell It to Sweeney (1927)
 The Beauty Shoppers (1927)
 Figures Don't Lie (1927)
 Tillie's Punctured Romance (1928)
 Court Martial (1928)
 Take Me Home (1928)
 A Thief in the Dark (1928)
 Avalanche (1928)
 The Studio Murder Mystery (1929)
 His Glorious Night (1929)
 Darkened Rooms (1929)
 Men Are Like That (1930)
 Code of Honor (1930)
 Song of the Caballero (1930)
 Sons of the Saddle (1930)
 The One Way Trail (1931)
 The Montana Kid (1931)
 Spirit of the West (1932)
 South of the Rio Grande (1932)
 Tangled Destinies (1932)
 Battling Buckaroo (1932)
 The Texas Tornado (1932)
 Galloping Romeo (1933)
 Via Pony Express (1933)
 Trailing North (1933)

References

External links

 
 
 Doris Hill at Virtual History

People from Roswell, New Mexico
American silent film actresses
Actresses from New Mexico
American film actresses
1905 births
1976 deaths
20th-century American actresses
People from Kingman, Arizona
WAMPAS Baby Stars
Vaudeville performers
Western (genre) film actresses